Coathanger or coat hanger may refer to:

Clothes hanger
Coathanger (Australian rules football), a dangerous high tackle in Australian Rules Football

Coathanger may also refer to:
Auckland Harbour Bridge, colloquially called this because of its shape
Brocchi's Cluster (astronomy), a random grouping of stars located in the constellation Vulpecula near the border with Sagitta
Sydney Harbour Bridge, colloquially called this because of its shape
Coathanger Antennae, an album by Diesel released in 2006
Windsor Hanger, an Internet entrepreneur
The Coathangers, American rock band
"The Coathanger", a song by Squarepusher from his 2008 album Just a Souvenir